Hoseynabad-e Qajar (also Romanized as Ḩoseynābād-e Qājār; also known as Ḩoseynābād and Ḩoseīnābād) is a village in Jamalabad Rural District, Sharifabad District, Pakdasht County, Tehran Province, Iran. At the 2006 census, its population was 33, in 10 families.

References 

Populated places in Pakdasht County